List of Hebrew words of Persian origin will contain the words loaned from Persian language to the Hebrew language. As the Jews lived as an exiled and homecoming population for almost 2 centuries under the Persian Empire, many of them borrowed words spoken within the empire and these words stayed with Hebrew for the generations to come and helped shaping Hebrew's set of vocabulary for terms the Israelites weren't familiar with prior to living and interacting with Persians. The name of the Persian monarch who let the Jews Return to Zion, Cyrus the Great, is a character beloved by the Jews for his part in their history.

Botanics
 Etrog - אתרוג = A fruit, it derives from the Persian word "turung" which means "Greenish-Yellowish" (originally from Tamil language).
 Fistuk - פיסטוק = Pistachio. Comes from "pistah" in Persian.
 Limon - לימון = Lemon, in Persian it's a general name for citrus.
 Lilach - לילך = A lighter shade of purple, and also the Hebrew name of Syringa. Derives from "nilak" in Persian.
 Pardes - פרדס = Orchard. This word was also the core for "Paradise".
 Shoshana - שושנה = Rose. From the name of the once capital of the Persian Empire, Shushan.
 Sukar - סוכר = Sugar, from the Persian word "shakar" that was borrowed from Sanskrit.

Politics
 Saris - סריס = A male servant to the monarch who was sterilised to prevent him from having any hopes of usurping the throne.
 Gizbar - גזבר = A man in-charge of the money and taxes of the local community. Comes from "ganzabara" in Persian which means: "Holder of the Treasury".

References

Hebrew language
P
Persian words similar to other languages
Lists of words